During the 1992–93 season, Borussia Dortmund played in the 1. Bundesliga, the highest tier of the German football league system.

Season summary
Dortmund dropped to fourth in the final table, but made up for this with their European form. They reached the UEFA Cup final, their first European final since 1966, but were soundly beaten 6–1 on aggregate by Juventus.

First team squad 
Squad at end of season

Competitions

Bundesliga

League table

References

Notes

External links 

Borussia Dortmund seasons
Borussia Dortmund